Geophis carinosus, also known as the keeled earth snake, is a snake of the colubrid family. It is endemic to Mexico.

References

Geophis
Snakes of North America
Endemic reptiles of Mexico
Reptiles described in 1941